Primera División A (Méxican First A Division) is a Mexican football tournament. This season was composed of Apertura 2003 and Clausura 2004. Dorados de Sinaloa was the winner of the promotion to First Division after winning León in the promotion playoff. '

Changes for the 2003–04 season
Cihuatlán was bought by new owners, for that reason the team was relocated to Culiacán and renamed Dorados de Sinaloa.
Yucatán was relocated to Playa del Carmen and renamed Inter Riviera Maya.
Chapulineros de Oaxaca was relocated to Tlaxcala and renamed Guerreros de Tlaxcala.
C.D. Guadalajara already had two subsidiary teams in the division (Tapatío and Nacional Tijuana), for this reason it was detached from the National Tijuana, which was bought by new owners who renamed to Mérida F.C. and relocated the team at Mérida, Yucatán.
Real Sociedad de Zacatecas was moved to Altamira and renamed Estudiantes de Santander.
Cruz Azul Hidalgo was relocated to Oaxaca and changed renamed Cruz Azul Oaxaca.
Tigrillos was relocated to Mexico City.
A new team called Trotamundos Tijuana was created from the franchise belonging to Colibríes de Morelos, which had been confiscated by the Femexfut.
Delfines de Coatzacoalcos was promoted from Second Division.

Changes for the Clausura 2004
After violent incidents in a game, Zacatepec owner moved the team to Xochitepec and renamed as Leones de Morelos. This fact represented the end of the club's original franchise.
Trotamundos Tijuana was bought by Pemex, the new owner company moved the team to Salamanca and renamed Petroleros de Salamanca.
Inter Riviera Maya was relocated to Córdoba and it was renamed Azucareros de Córdoba, however, the team played most of its games in Mexico City.

Stadiums and locations

Clausura 2004 new teams

Apertura 2003

Group league tables

Group 1

Group 2

Group 3

Group 4

General league table

Results

Reclasification series

First leg

Second leg

Liguilla 

(p.t.) The team was classified by its best position in the general table

Quarter-finals

First leg

Second leg

Semi-finals

First leg

Second leg

Final

First leg

Second leg

Clausura 2004

Group league tables

Group 1

Group 2

Group 3

Group 4

General league table

Results

Reclasification series

First leg

Second leg

Liguilla

Quarter-finals

First leg

Second leg

Semi-finals

First leg

Second leg

Final

First leg

Second leg

Relegation table

Promotion final
The promotion final faced Dorados against León to determine the winner of the First Division Promotion. Dorados was the winner.

First leg

Second leg

References

2003–04 in Mexican football
Mexico
Mexico
Ascenso MX seasons